There are 118 Division II teams in the National Junior College Athletic Association (NJCAA) that play in 24 different regions.

Members

Arkansas
North Arkansas College Pioneers in Harrison

Arizona
Chandler-Gilbert Community College Coyotes in Chandler
Glendale Community College (Arizona) Gauchos in Glendale
Phoenix College Bears in Phoenix
Pima Community College Aztecs in Tucson
Scottsdale Community College Artichokes in Scottsdale
South Mountain Community College Cougars in Phoenix
Mesa Community College Thunderbirds in Mesa

Delaware
Delaware Technical Community College-Stanton-Wilmington Campus Spirit in Stanton
Delaware Technical Community College-Terry Campus Hawks in Dover
Delaware Technical Community College-Owens Campus Roadrunners in Georgetown

Florida
Florida Gateway College Timberwolves in Lake City
Pasco–Hernando State College Conquistadors in New Port Richey

Illinois
Black Hawk College-Moline Braves in Moline
Carl Sandburg College Chargers in Galesburg
College of Lake County Lancers in Grayslake
Danville Area Community College Jaguars in Danville
Elgin Community College Spartans in Elgin
Heartland Community College Hawks in Normal
Illinois Central College Cougars in East Peoria
Illinois Valley Community College Eagles in Oglesby
John Wood Community College Trail Blazers in Quincy
Kishwaukee College Kougars in Malta
Lewis & Clark Community College Trailblazers in Godfrey
Lincoln Land Community College Loggers in Springfield
McHenry County College Scots in Crystal Lake
Moraine Valley Community College Cyclones in Palos Hills
Morton College Panthers in Cicero
Oakton Community College Raiders in Des Plaines
Olive-Harvey College Panthers in Chicago
Parkland College Cobras in Champaign
Prairie State College Pioneers in Chicago Heights
Rend Lake College Warriors in Ina
Sauk Valley Community College Skyhawks in Dixon 
South Suburban College Bulldogs in South Holland
Spoon River College Mudcats in Canton
Triton College Trojans in River Grove
Waubonsee Community College Chiefs in Sugar Grove
Wilbur Wright College Rams in Chicago

Indiana
Ancilla College Chargers in Donaldson

Iowa
Clinton Community College (Iowa) Cougars in Clinton
Des Moines Area Community College Bears in Boone
Ellsworth Community College Panthers in Iowa Falls
Iowa Central Community College Tritons in Fort Dodge
Kirkwood Community College Eagles in Cedar Rapids
North Iowa Area Community College Trojans in Mason City
Southwestern Community College Spartans in Creston

Kansas
Brown Mackie College Lions in Salina
Hesston College Larks in Hesston
Highland Community College Scotties in Highland (http://www.highlandcc.edu/)
Johnson County Community College Cavaliers in Overland Park
Fort Scott Community College Greyhounds in Fort Scott

Louisiana
Louisiana State University at Eunice Bengals in Eunice

Maryland
Baltimore City Community College Panthers in Baltimore
CCBC-Catonsville Cardinals in Catonsville
CCBC-Dundalk Lions in Dundalk
CCBC-Essex Knights in Essex
Cecil College Seahawks in North East
College of Southern Maryland Hawks in La Plata
Frederick Community College Cougars in Frederick (http://www.frederick.edu/)
Harford Community College Fighting Owls in Bel Air
Howard Community College Dragons in Columbia
Prince George's Community College Owls in Largo

Massachusetts
Massasoit Community College Warriors in Brockton

Michigan
Alpena Community College Lumberjacks in Alpena
Bay de Noc Community College Norse in Escanaba
Delta College (Michigan) Pioneers in University Center
Detroit Community Christian College Lions in Detroit
Glen Oaks Community College Vikings in Centreville
Gogebic Community College Samsons in Ironwood
Grand Rapids Community College Raiders in Grand Rapids
Henry Ford College Hawks in Dearborn
Jackson College Jets in Jackson
Kellogg Community College Bruins in Battle Creek
Kirtland Community College Firebirds in Roscommon
Lake Michigan College Indians in Benton Harbor
Lansing Community College Stars in Lansing
Macomb Community College Monarchs in Warren
Mott Community College Bears in Flint
Muskegon Community College Jayhawks in Muskegon
Oakland Community College Raiders in Bloomfield Hills
Schoolcraft College Ocelots in Garden City
St. Clair County Community College Skippers in Port Huron
Wayne County Community College Wildcats in Detroit

Minnesota
Dakota County Technical College Blue Knights in Rosemount

Missouri
Cottey College Comets in Nevada
Metropolitan Community College-Longview Lakers in Lee's Summit
Metropolitan Community College-Penn Valley Scouts in Kansas City
North Central Missouri College Pirates in Trenton
St. Louis Community College Archers in Florissant Valley (men’s soccer), Forest Park (men’s/women’s basketball), Meramec (baseball, softball, women’s soccer and volleyball)

Nebraska
Central Community College at Columbus Raiders in Columbus
Southeast Community College Storm in Lincoln

New Jersey
Burlington County College Barons in Pemberton
County College of Morris Titans in Randolph
Essex County College Wolverines in Newark
Mercer County Community College Vikings in Trenton
Salem Community College Oaks in Carneys Point

New York
Erie Community College Kats in Buffalo
Genesee Community College Cougars in Batavia
Jamestown Community College Jayhawks in Jamestown
Jamestown Community College-Cattaraugus Jaguars in Olean
Monroe Community College Tribunes in Rochester
Niagara County Community College Thunderwolves in Sanborn
Orange County Community College Colts in Middletown
Sullivan County Community College Generals in Loch Sheldrake
Hudson Valley Community College Vikings in Troy

North Carolina
Vance-Granville Community College Vanguards in Henderson
Fayetteville Technical Community College Trojans in Fayetteville

North Dakota
Bismarck State College Mystics in Bismarck
Dakota College at Bottineau Lumberjacks in Bottineau
United Tribes Technical College Thunderbirds in Bismarck

Ohio
Cincinnati State Technical & Community College Surge in Cincinnati
Clark State Community College Eagles in Springfield
Columbus State Community College Cougars in Columbus
Cuyahoga Community College Triceratops in Parma
Edison Community College Chargers in Piqua
Lakeland Community College Lakers in Kirtland
Owens Community College Express in Toledo
Sinclair Community College Tartan Pride in Dayton

Pennsylvania
Community College of Beaver County Titans in Monaca
Harcum College Bears in Bryn Mawr
Lackawanna College Falcons in Scranton

Rhode Island
Community College of Rhode Island Knights in Warwick

Texas
Coastal Bend College Cougars in Beeville

Virginia
Patrick & Henry Community College Patriots in Martinsville
Danville Community College Knights in Danville
Northern Virginia Community College Nighthawks in Annandale
Bryant and Stratton College Bobcats in Virginia Beach

Wisconsin
Bryant & Stratton College Bobcats in Milwaukee

Note
The schools listed above may not compete in Division II in all sports. For instance, Highland (Kan.) and Johnson County field teams in Division II in most sports but their baseball teams compete in Division I. Other schools in Kansas may compete in Division I in some sports but in Division II in others. Many compete in Division II in softball and volleyball while competing in Division I in basketball.

See also
List of NJCAA Division I schools
List of NJCAA Division III schools
List of community college football programs
List of USCAA institutions
List of NCCAA institutions
List of NAIA institutions
List of NCAA Division I institutions
List of NCAA Division II institutions
List of NCAA Division III institutions

References

External links
NJCAA Members
NJCAA archived

Division 2